Munaza Hassan is a Pakistani politician who had been a member of the National Assembly of Pakistan, from August 2018 till January 2023. Previously she was a member of the National Assembly from June 2013 to May 2018.

Political career

She was elected to the National Assembly of Pakistan as a candidate of Pakistan Tehreek-e-Insaf (PTI) on reserved seats for women from Punjab in 2013 Pakistani general election.

She was re-elected to the National Assembly as a candidate of PTI on a seat reserved for women from Punjab in the 2018 Pakistani general election.

References

Pakistan Tehreek-e-Insaf MNAs
Living people
Year of birth missing (living people)
Pakistani MNAs 2013–2018
Women members of the National Assembly of Pakistan
Pakistani MNAs 2018–2023
21st-century Pakistani women politicians